Tall Kohneh (also Romanized as Tal-e Kohneh and Tol-e Khoneh) is a village in Rostam-e Yek Rural District, in the Central District of Rostam County, Fars Province, Iran. At the 2006 census, its population was 181, in 37 families.

References 

Populated places in Rostam County